Jezdimir Bogdanski (17 November 1930 – 30 October 2007) was a Macedonian politician and a participant in the National Liberation War.

See also
Kumanovo

Honours
   Commemorative Medal of the Partisans - 1941

References

Mayors of Kumanovo
1930 births
2007 deaths